D.C. United has had several head coaches since the inaugural 1996 Major League Soccer season. The club has had seven permanent head coaches. Bruce Arena was the club's inaugural coach in 1996, leaving his position coaching the men's soccer team at the University of Virginia. In 1998, after winning two MLS Cups and the 1996 U.S. Open Cup, Arena left to coach the United States men's national soccer team. Thomas Rongen then left his head coach position with the New England Revolution to come to D.C. Rongen led D.C. to another MLS cup in 1999 but was replaced by Ray Hudson in 2002, who was hired after the contraction of his Miami Fusion F.C. that year.

Hudson saw D.C. United fall to last in the table in 2002 and lose in the first round of the playoffs in 2003. Former Chicago Fire player Piotr (Peter) Nowak was then hired to replace Hudson, and led D.C. United to their fourth MLS Cup in 2004. Nowak left on December 21, 2006 for an assistant coaching position on the U.S. men's national team. Tom Soehn, another former Chicago Fire player, was hired next, and was the first American to coach the team since Bruce Arena. He left the team at the end of the 2009 season. On December 28, 2009 D.C. hired former Kansas City Wizards manager Curt Onalfo as their sixth head coach. On August 4, 2010, Onalfo was dismissed as head coach of D.C. United and former player Ben Olsen was named interim head coach. On November 29, 2010, Olsen was named head coach on a permanent basis. After a string of losses during the 2020 season, Ben Olsen was replaced by Chad Ashton on October 8, 2020. Aston's tenure as interim coach ended at the conclusion of the 2020 season, and D.C. appointed Hernán Losada as permanent head coach on January 18, 2021.
On July 12, 2022, former Manchester United and DC United star Wayne Rooney came back to DC as their manager.

List of head coaches
This list includes all those who have managed the club since 1996, when the club joined Major League Soccer for the first time, whether coaching on a full-time or caretaker basis. Games played include all League, Cup, Playoff, and Continental matches, and the win percentage is calculated from the total of games.

Figures correct as of 12 July 2022. Includes all competitive matches
M = Matches played; W = Matches won; D = Matches drawn; L = Matches lost; F = Goals for; A = Goals against

1 Win% is rounded to a whole.
2 Three drawn cup games lost and one won after extra time or on penalties.
3 MLS matches that went into penalty kick shootouts are counted as a draw

Coaches with Honors

References
General

 League and Playoff records sourced to: 
 Cup records sourced to: 
 Continental records sourced to:  

Notes

 
DC United
D.C. United head coaches